Zinc proteinate is the final product resulting from the chelation of zinc with amino acids and/or partially hydrolyzed proteins. It is used as a nutritional animal feed supplement formulated to prevent and/or correct zinc deficiency in animals. Zinc proteinate can be used in place of zinc sulfate and zinc methionine.

References

External links 
Association of American Feed Control Officials
Life Cycle Trace Mineral Needs for Reducing Stress in Beef Production, Montana State University

Dietary minerals
proteinate